The Yaroslavsky shooting was a mass murder that occurred in Yaroslavsky, Primorsky Krai, Russia on 25 August 2002, when 40-year-old police captain Sergey Semidovskiy killed five people and wounded ten others in and outside a bar with a Saiga carbine, after an argument with several customers. The drunk gunman then shot himself in the chest and was taken to a hospital in Khorol, where he tried again to commit suicide and eventually died of cardiac arrest on 27 August.

As a consequence of the shooting Colonel Lebedev, head of the Khorolsky District department of internal affairs, as well as Lieutenant-Colonel Kurgeyev, head of the personnel and training department, and Lieutenant-Colonel Kotyshev, head of public security police, were dismissed, and disciplinary measures were taken against several other members of the local police.

Victims
Alexander Kuznetsov (Александр Кузнецов), 33, died on 27 August

References

External links
Стали известны подробности массового убийства в Ярославке, NTV (26 August 2002)

21st-century mass murder in Russia
2002 murders in Russia
Attacks in Russia in 2002
August 2002 crimes
August 2002 events in Russia
Mass murder in 2002
Mass shootings in Russia
Murder–suicides in Asia
Primorsky Krai
2002 mass shootings in Europe